Joseph Daniel Turner Mawle (born 21 March 1974) is an English actor. Mawle is best known for his roles as Benjen Stark in Game of Thrones, Detective Inspector Jedediah Shine in Ripper Street, Firebrace in Birdsong, Jesus Christ in The Passion, Adar in The Lord of the Rings: The Rings of Power and Odysseus in Troy: Fall of a City.

Early life
Mawle was born in Oxford, England. He grew up in a Victorian manor house on a farm outside Shipston-on-Stour, Warwickshire. He is one of three children from a family with a history of nine generations of farming in Warwickshire. His mother was a teacher. His father Richard still farms the land.

He attended the Croft prep school on the outskirts of Stratford-upon-Avon, where he was diagnosed as severely dyslexic; consequently, he went from the ages of 13 to 16 to a boarding school for special needs. Mawle left the school at 16 to become an actor but contracted labyrinthitis, leaving him 70 per cent hearing-impaired in the upper register and with tinnitus. He persuaded the director of the local college at Stratford-upon-Avon to let him study for a BTEC in performing arts while doing an assortment of jobs such as fitness instructor and dishwasher. 

He did some acting for the Box Clever Theatre Company and in his own production of Solo Hamlet. He won a scholarship to study  at the Bristol Old Vic Theatre School.

Career
Mawle graduated from Bristol Old Vic Theatre School in 2002, in the same year he appeared in TV adverts for Guinness. He left in 2002, with no agent, and worked as an assistant in a special needs school. He landed his first major role in a 2003 production of Troilus and Cressida, playing Troilus for Shakespeare at the Tobacco factory, worked at the Nuffield Theatre, Southampton, in Hamlet, and in the Royal Exchange, Manchester's production of Antony and Cleopatra in 2005. 

It was his performance in the television film Soundproof (2006), wherein a deaf actor was needed for the lead role, that made his biggest impact. Mawle was nominated for the RTS Breakthrough on Screen Award, and director Ed Coulthard won the BAFTA for best director in 2007.
 
Mawle has appeared in a number of subsequent British television productions, including Dunkirk, winner of the Huw Wheldon BAFTA Award for Factual Drama, and Adrian Shergold's Persuasion (2007) and Channel 4's gay drama Clapham Junction, in the role of Tim. Time Out said, "Mawle and Treadaway put in Bafta-winning efforts". In 2008, Mawle starred as Jesus in the BBC/HBO Films miniseries of The Passion, and as a guest star in the Foyle's War "Broken Souls" episode.

In 2008, he returned to the theatre in The Last Days of Judas Iscariot, at the Almeida Theatre, directed by Rupert Goold. He was listed for Outstanding Newcomer by the Evening Standard Theatre Awards and nominated for WhatsOnStage Theatre Choice Awards for Best Newcomer for his performance as Judas.

In 2009, he featured in multiple films:  James Marsh's Nineteen Eighty (part of the Red Riding Trilogy), Philip Ridley's Heartless, and Dominic Savage's Freefall opposite Dominic Cooper and Aidan Gillen. On television that year, he starred in episode 4 of Jimmy McGovern's The Street.

In 2010, Mawle featured in artist David Austen's End of Love and in the short film Sometimes The Moon Is Velvet, which toured festivals. He also appeared in Agatha Christie's Murder on the Orient Express, the BBC drama Five Daughters, Dominic Savage's Dive, and Made in Dagenham starring Sally Hawkins. In 2011, he starred as Gerald Crich alongside Rosamund Pike as Crich's lover Gudrun Brangwen, in the BBC Four television adaptation of Women in Love.

Also in 2011, he was featured in The Horrible Crowes' music video for their debut single "Behold the Hurricane" and joined the HBO series Game of Thrones as Benjen Stark. Mawle appeared in the pilot episode and returned to the role in Season 6.

Mawle appeared in several projects in 2012, including the Working Title production of Sebastian Faulks' acclaimed novel Birdsong, the Bruce Willis film The Cold Light of Day, the Tim Burton-produced film Abraham Lincoln: Vampire Hunter, and the independent British film Shell.

2013 saw Mawle portray Stephen Beaumont in The Tunnel, and Detective Inspector Jedediah Shine on Ripper Street. Mawle had a lead role in the horror film The Hallow.

In October 2019, Mawle joined the cast of The Lord of the Rings: The Rings of Power on Amazon Prime Video: he was one of the first actors to join the project, and his involvement was later confirmed by Amazon themselves in early 2020. He played the central antagonist “Adar”, a fallen Elf who became the first Uruk, father of the Orcs. In December 2022, it was revealed that the role of Adar would be recast for season two of the series, with Sam Hazeldine taking over the role and Mawle confirming on Twitter that he would not return.

Filmography

Film

Television

Theatre 
2003: Troilus and Cressida as Troilus (Shakespeare at the Tobacco Factory)
2004: Hamlet (the Nuffield Theatre, Southampton)
2005: Antony & Cleopatra (Royal Exchange, Manchester)
2008: The Last Days of Judas Iscariot (the Almeida Theatre)

References

External links

Living people
1974 births
20th-century English male actors
21st-century English male actors
Alumni of Bristol Old Vic Theatre School
English male Shakespearean actors
English male stage actors
English male television actors
Male actors from Oxfordshire
People from Oxford